Apostolos Vesyropoulos ( born 1966) is a Greek politician, economist and Deputy Minister for Taxation Policy and Public Property for New Democracy. He is also an MP for Imathia.

Biography 
Vesyropoulos was born in 1966 in Veria. He studied at the School of Management and Economics of the ATEI of Larissa (Department of Accounting), and did his postgraduate studies in the Department of Public Law and Political Science of the Law School of the Democritus University of Thrace.

He worked as a tax collector in Veria and from 2004 to 2008 he was a member of the board of directors of DAKE Tax Office of Imathia - Pella - Pieria. He also served as Municipal Councilor in Veria and deputy mayor of Imathia, responsible for the Directorates of Rural Development, Finance, Trade and Consumer Protection. From 2010 he served as vice-president of the Prefectural Administrative Committee (NODE) of Imathia for the New Democracy party. 

He was elected as MP for New Democracy in Imathia in the elections of June 2012 and re-elected in January and September 2015, and 2019. The Mitsotakis government assigned Vesyropoulos as Deputy Minister on taxation policy and state assets.

References

Citations

Sources 

Government ministers of Greece
1966 births
Living people
People from Veria
Greek MPs 2019–2023